Rous Samoeun (born 20 December 1994) is a Cambodian footballer who plays as a defender for Prey Veng on loan from Visakha and the Cambodia national football team.

International career
Samoeun scored his first international goal in a friendly match against Bhutan, outsmarting goalie Hari Gurung to slot the ball in the net in the 28th minute.

International goals

Style of play 
A prime example of a modern full-back. Sameoun is fast, skillful and versatile, capable of playing on both the left and right flanks. Though predominantly a left-back he has also played as a winger. His attacking mindset and willingness to play high up the field has led to some dodgy defensive performances, sometimes not being able to track back to defend in time after going on the attack.

Honours

Club
Boeung Ket Angkor
 Cambodian League: 2017
 Cambodian League: 2016
 2015 Mekong Club Championship: Runner up

References

1993 births
Living people
Cambodian footballers
Cambodia international footballers
Boeung Ket Rubber Field players
Association football defenders
Visakha FC players
Cambodian Premier League players